Emma Boyce (1867–1929) was a Hackney suffragette and anti-war activist.

Emma had been involved from 1907 in the Social Democratic Foundation (SDF) as a speaker and activist in the women's circles. She was appointed as organiser of the Women’s Education Committee but resigned in 1910, although she continued her activism in the British Socialist Party.

At the age of almost 50, she became a tireless organiser for the East London Federation of Suffragettes, working closely with Sylvia Pankhurst. At the outset of World War 1, she traveled the country in her ELFS role, concentrating on Glasgow and Newcastle, but also speaking several times a week all over the country. She spoke for the suffrage movement but also against the war's conscription, advocating for freedom of choice for the working classes.

After the war, Emma was elected as a Hackney Labour Councillor from 1918 until 1923. From then until her death, she served as a life governor of the London Maternity Hospital.

References

1867 births
1929 deaths
English suffragettes
Councillors in the London Borough of Hackney
Labour Party (UK) councillors
Social Democratic Federation members
English socialist feminists
Women councillors in England